Admiral Sir Dudley Burton Napier North,  (25 November 1881 – 15 May 1961) was a Royal Navy officer who served during First and Second World Wars.

Naval career
North entered the Royal Navy as an acting sub lieutenant, and was confirmed in that rank 15 March 1901. He was appointed to the HMS Charger on 31 December 1902, while she was serving the Devonport instructional flotilla.

He became Director of Naval Operations in January 1930 and Flag Officer Commanding, Royal Yachts in December 1934. Chief of Staff, Home Fleet in December 1932 He was promoted vice admiral on 19 June 1936.

North went on to be Flag Officer Commanding Gibraltar and Mediterranean Approaches in November 1939 and was promoted admiral on 8 May 1940. He was relieved of his command in December 1940 on the grounds of his failure to challenge a Vichy French naval squadron some three months previously. He had narrowly escaped replacement in response to his earlier objection to the attack on Mers-el-Kébir. He was later exonerated of blame. Ludovic Kennedy considered the failure to challenge the squadron the fault of people in London, not North.

Personal life
Eglantine died in 1917 of pernicious anaemia. North later married Eilean Graham in 1923 and they had four children. Their daughter Elizabeth was a novelist.

Honours and decorations
  Knight Grand Cross of the Royal Victorian Order 12 June 1947 (KCVO 1937)
  Companion of the Order of the Bath 1935
  Companion of the Order of the Star of India 1922
  Companion of the Order of St Michael and St George
  Commander of the Legion of Merit (United States) 30 April 1946

References

External links 

 The Papers of Admiral Sir Dudley North held at Churchill Archives Centre

Companions of the Order of St Michael and St George
1881 births
1961 deaths
Royal Navy admirals of World War II
People from Great Yarmouth
Deputy Lieutenants of Dorset
Knights Grand Cross of the Royal Victorian Order
Companions of the Order of the Star of India
Companions of the Order of the Bath
Commanders of the Legion of Merit
Recipients of the Order of Saint Stanislaus (Russian)
Recipients of the Croix de Guerre (France)
Recipients of the Order of the Rising Sun
British Home Guard officers
Equerries
Royal Navy officers of World War I
Royal Navy officers of World War II
Military personnel from Norfolk